Abies fabri (Faber's fir) is a conifer species in the family Pinaceae.

The shoots are yellowish-brown, hairless or slightly hairy.

The most serious threat to Abies fabri seems to be acid rain from nearby industries in Chengdu.

There are two subspecies:
Abies fabri subsp. fabri. Central and western Sichuan, in areas with heavy summer monsoon rainfall.
Abies fabri subsp. minensis. Northwestern Sichuan, with a slightly drier climate.

Abies fabri is closely related to Abies delavayi and Abies forrestii, which replace it to the south and southwest respectively in southern Sichuan and Yunnan, and to Abies fargesii, which replaces it further north in Gansu.

References

External links

 Abies fabri (GBIF) Occurrence data map + images

fabri
Endemic flora of China
Trees of China
Vulnerable flora of Asia
Taxonomy articles created by Polbot